The Silver Kangaroo is a silver coin originating from Australia and produced at the Perth Mint.  This is a bullion coin meant for investment in silver.  An Australian silver kangaroo coin, produced at the Royal Australian Mint (RAM), is collected for its numismatic value.  The obverse of the coin always depicts Queen Elizabeth II.  The reverse side features a red kangaroo jumping.  Unlike the Australian silver koala and silver kookaburra coins, the reverse image does not change every year.  The obverse image on the RAM silver coin does change every year.  The mintage every year is unlimited, unlike the koala and kookaburra coins which have a maximum mintage of 300,000 and 500,000 respectively.  No special editions or privy marks have appeared for the one-ounce bullion coin.

See also
 Australian Silver Koala
 Australian Silver Kookaburra
 Bullion
 Bullion coin
 Inflation hedge
 Silver as an investment

References
 General
 2020 Standard Catalog of World Coins - 1901–2000, 47th Edition, publication date 2019, Krause Publications, 
 2020 Standard Catalog of World Coins - 2001–Date, 14th Edition, publication date 2019, Krause Publications, 

Specific

Bullion coins of Australia
Silver bullion coins